The 2020 Pittsburgh Panthers men's soccer team represents University of Pittsburgh during the 2020 NCAA Division I men's soccer season.  The Panthers are led by head coach Jay Vidovich, in his fifth season.  They play home games at Ambrose Urbanic Field.  This is the team's 67th season playing organized men's college soccer and their 8th playing in the Atlantic Coast Conference.

The teams' 2020 season was significantly impacted by the COVID-19 pandemic, which curtailed the fall season and caused the NCAA Tournament to be played in Spring 2021. The ACC was one of the only two conferences in men's soccer to play in the fall of 2020.  The ACC also held a mini-season during the spring of 2021.

The Panthers finished the fall season 7–1–0 and 4–0–0 in ACC play to finish in first place in the North Division.  In the ACC Tournament they defeated Duke in the Quarterfinals and Notre Dame in the Semifinals before losing to Clemson in the Final.  They finished the spring season 6–1–0 and 5–1–0 in ACC play, to finish in first place in the Coastal Division.  They received an at-large bid to the NCAA Tournament because they lost the automatic bid play-in game to Clemson.  As the second seed in the tournament, they defeated Monmouth in the Second Round, UCF in the Third Round, and Washington in the Quarterfinals before losing to Indiana in the Semifinals to end their season.

Previous season 

The 2019 Pittsburgh men's soccer team finished the season with a 10–8–2 overall record and a 4–3–1 ACC record.  Pitt were seeded fourth–overall in the 2019 ACC Men's Soccer Tournament.  The Panthers won their first round match up against NC State, but fell to Clemson in the semifinals.  The Panthers earned an at-large bid into the 2019 NCAA Division I Men's Soccer Tournament, making it their first berth into the NCAA Tournament since 1965. Pitt defeated Lehigh in the first round, before losing to  the eventual national champions, Georgetown, in the second round.

Preseason

Preseason rankings

ACC Media Poll 
The ACC men's soccer media poll was released on September 8, 2020. Pitt was picked to finish second in the ACC North Division.

Player movement

Players leaving

Players arriving

Squad

Roster

Updated October 28, 2020

Team management

Source:

Schedule 

Source:

|-
!colspan=7 style=""| Fall Exhibition

|-
!colspan=7 style=""| Fall regular season
|-

|-
!colspan=7 style=""| ACC Tournament
|-

|-
!colspan=6 style=""| Spring Exhibition
|-

|-
!colspan=6 style=""| Spring regular season

|-
!colspan=7 style=""| NCAA Automatic Bid Play-In

|-
!colspan=7 style=""| NCAA Tournament
|-

Awards and honors

Rankings

Fall 2020

Spring 2021

2021 MLS Super Draft

Source:

References 

2020
Pittsburgh Panthers
Pittsburgh Panthers
Pittsburgh Panthers men's soccer
Pitt
NCAA Division I Men's Soccer Tournament College Cup seasons